Erith and District Hospital is a health facility in Park Crescent, Erith, London, England. Its former X-Ray Department, which is located underground, is a Grade II listed building.

History
The facility has its origins in a couple of cottages on Crayford Road which were converted for clinical use as the Erith, Crayford, Belvedere, and Abbey Wood Hospital in 1871. It moved to new facilities in Erith High Street in 1875 and to purpose-built premises in Park Crescent, which were officially opened by the Prince of Wales, in 1924. It was extended in 1933 and an underground hospital, operated as part of the Emergency Medical Service, was built in 1938 and was in use throughout the Second World War. It joined the National Health Service as Erith and District Hospital in 1948 and a new outpatient department was completed in 1954.

References

Hospital buildings completed in 1871
Hospitals established in 1871
NHS hospitals in London
1871 establishments in England